Ryszard Wincenty Berwiński (28 February 1817 in Polwica, Poznań, Prussia – 19 November 1879 in Constantinople, then part of the Ottoman Empire) was a noted Polish poet, translator, folklorist, and nationalist. 

Between 1852 and 1854 he was a delegate in the Prussian parliament, before joining a Polish-Turkish military expedition in 1855.  He was also a member of the Polish National Committee.

Works
 O dwunastu rozbójnikach, 1838
 Bogunka na Gople, 1840
 Don Juan Poznański, 1842 (parody of Don Juan by George Byron)

Polish male writers
1817 births
1879 deaths
Poles - political prisoners in the Prussian partition
Participants of the Slavic Congress in Prague 1848